American singer Kelly Rowland has recorded songs for her four studio albums and has collaborated with other artists for duets and featured songs on their respective albums and charity singles. Her discography as a solo artist began in 2000 on the remix of R&B recording artist Avant's single "Separated". It also includes three studio albums (and an upcoming fourth album), two compilation albums, one box set, two extended plays, thirty-seven singles, including thirteen as a featured artist and five promotional singles, and two charted songs.

During the hiatus of Destiny's Child, Rowland released her debut solo album Simply Deep in 2002, which contained influences of alternative-R&B and rock music. It included her joint worldwide number-one single "Dilemma" with rapper Nelly, as well as the singles "Stole", "Can't Nobody" and "Train on a Track". Following Destiny's Child's disbandment, Rowland prepared her next studio album initially under the title My Story. However this was revamped and finally released in 2007 as Ms. Kelly. It featured the lead single, "Like This" with Eve, and the international hit single "Work". A third single "Ghetto", with Snoop Dogg, was also released, while the re-release spawned another single, "Daylight", with Travis McCoy.

In 2009, Columbia Records ended their contract with Rowland. Since then, Rowland worked on a number of collaborations with European singers; most notably French singer Nâdiya, Italian singer Tiziano Ferro, and French DJ David Guetta. Rowland collaborated with Guetta for several songs on his One Love album. This included Rowland's feature on the worldwide dance hit "When Love Takes Over". In 2010, Rowland released "Everywhere You Go" (with Rhythm of Africa) for the 2010 FIFA World Cup, recorded a version of "Wonderful Christmastime" for the album Now That's What I Call Christmas! 4, and featured on UK grime artist Tinie Tempah's single "Invincible", taken from his debut album Disc-Overy.

Released songs

Unreleased songs

References

External links
Official website

Rowland, Kelly